Big Bucks Trivia is a quiz arcade game released by Dynasoft in 1986. The player answers questions from various trivia categories, in order to win "big bucks".

References

1986 video games
Arcade video games
Arcade-only video games
North America-exclusive video games
Quiz video games
Video games developed in the United States